The 1810 New Hampshire gubernatorial election was held on March 13, 1810.

Incumbent Federalist Governor Jeremiah Smith was defeated by Democratic-Republican nominee John Langdon in a re-match of the previous year's election.

General election

Candidates
John Langdon, Democratic-Republican, former Governor
Jeremiah Smith, Federalist, incumbent Governor

Results

Notes

References

1810
New Hampshire
Gubernatorial